Sabrina Annlynn Carpenter (born May 11, 1999) is an American singer and actress. Carpenter made her acting debut with an appearance in the television crime show Law & Order: Special Victims Unit and had a recurring role on Fox's short-lived series, The Goodwin Games, which lasted three months. She starred in the Disney Channel comedy series Girl Meets World (2014–2017); in 2016, she appeared in a television movie, Adventures in Babysitting, for the network.

Carpenter has starred in several feature films, including Horns (2013), The Hate U Give (2018), The Short History of the Long Road (2019), Clouds (2020), and Emergency (2022). She also starred in three Netflix films, Tall Girl (2019), its sequel (2022), and Work It (2020).

In 2014, her debut music single "Can't Blame a Girl for Trying" and EP of the same name were released. She released a debut album, Eyes Wide Open, in 2015 and three additional studio albums, Evolution (2016), Singular: Act I (2018), and Singular: Act II (2019). She released a fifth studio album, Emails I Can't Send, in 2022.

Early life 
Carpenter was born on May 11, 1999, in Quakertown, Pennsylvania, to David and Elizabeth Carpenter, and raised in East Greenville. She was raised alongside three older sisters and was homeschooled. At age 10, she began posting videos on YouTube of her singing. Her father built a recording studio for her to fuel her passion for music. In 2011, she placed third in a singing contest, The Next Miley Cyrus Project, run by Miley Cyrus.

Acting career and other projects

2011–2013: Early acting roles
Carpenter's first acting role was in 2011 in a guest role on the NBC drama series Law & Order: Special Victims Unit. Around the same time, she appeared on Chinese state-owned television station Hunan Broadcasting System's Gold Mango Audience festival, performing "Something's Got a Hold on Me". In 2012, Carpenter had a recurring role on Fox's three-month series The Goodwin Games.

She appeared in a 2013 film Horns and performed a song, "Smile", for an album, Disney Fairies: Faith, Trust, and Pixie Dust"; the song charted on Radio Disney. In Sofia the First, she had a recurring role as Princess Vivian, in which she also performed the song "All You Need" with show star Ariel Winter.

2014–present: Breakthrough with Girl Meets World and other ventures
In January 2013, Carpenter was cast in a Disney Channel series Girl Meets World.  In 2015, Carpenter starred in a Disney Channel Original Movie, Further Adventures in Babysitting. The same year, she also appeared in a Pasadena Playhouse production of Peter Pan and Tinker Bell: A Pirate's Christmas.

In 2018, Carpenter appeared in The Hate U Give, based on the novel. The film was released in October 2018. In 2018, she was cast a drama film The Short History of the Long Road. In May 2018, Carpenter was included in Nylon magazine's "25 Gen Z'ers Changing The World". In July 2019, she was cast in a film adaptation of The Distance From Me to You. She is set to star and produce the film with Girl Meets World co-star Danielle Fishel .  In January 2019, Carpenter was cast in a Netflix film, Tall Girl.

In March 2020, she made her Broadway debut in Mean Girls as Cady Heron. Carpenter was intended to play the role for a 3 month run, but the show closed due to the COVID-19 pandemic and did not reopen. In December 2020, she was named to Forbes''' 30 Under 30 list in the Hollywood and entertainment category.

She was cast in Clouds, a 2020 teen drama film. In April 2021, Carpenter was cast in Amazon Studios' comedy-drama thriller film Emergency, which is based on a 2018 short film of the same name. In September 2021, she appeared in the third volume of Prime Video's special, Savage X Fenty Show, focused on that year's Savage X Fenty fashion show, as one of the models. In November 2021, she became a brand ambassador for Samsung USA as part of the company's "Team Galaxy" partnership program. In January 2022, Emergency premiered at the 2022 Sundance Film Festival followed by a limited theatrical release and an Amazon Prime Video release in May 2022. The following month, she appeared in a Netflix teen romantic comedy sequel, Tall Girl 2. In June 2022, Carpenter announced her debut fragrance in partnership with Scent Beauty, called Sweet Tooth, which would be released in September 2022, with samples made available in the U.S. that month.

 Music career 
 2014–2017: Musical beginnings
In 2014, Carpenter launched a music career with the release of a single, "Can't Blame a Girl for Trying", which premiered on Radio Disney and was released on iTunes. The song is the title track on her debut EP of the same name and was released in April 2014. Carpenter is featured on the Girl Meets World theme song, "Take On The World". She performed the song "Stand Out" in the Disney Channel movie How to Build a Better Boy, which premiered in August 2014. In July 2014, Carpenter contributed lead vocals to Disney Channel Circle of Stars' cover version of "Do You Want to Build a Snowman?"

In January 2015, Carpenter released the lead single from her debut studio album titled "We'll Be The Stars" with its music video being released in February of the same year.  Carpenter's debut studio album, "Eyes Wide Open", would be released on April 14, 2015, debuting and peaking at 43 on the Billboard 200. "Eyes Wide Open" would go on to spend 4 weeks on the Billboard 200 making it her longest charting album to date. Every song on Carpenter's debut EP would go on to be included on the album. The opening and title track of the album "Eyes Wide Open" would be released as the second and last single from the album with its music video premiering in June 2015. On April 25th, 2015 "We'll Be The Stars" as well as "Eyes Wide Open" would be performed for the first time at the 2015 Radio Disney Music Awards where she also won an award in the category "Best Crush Song" for her song "Can't Blame a Girl For Trying".  In August, 2015 Carpenter made an appearance at the D23 Expo performing songs from her debut album.

In February 2016 Carpenter released the standalone single titled "Smoke and Fire" with its music video being released in March of the same year. "Smoke and Fire" would also be performed at the 2016 Radio Disney Music Awards.

On July 22, 2016, Carpenter announced the lead single from her second studio album titled "On Purpose" would be released later that same month. The music video for "On Purpose" would go on to be released on August 12, 2016. On August 12, 2016, Carpenter would headline the Bethlehem's Musikfest festival where she would perform "On Purpose". In September 2016 Carpenter announced her second studio album would be titled "Evolution" and would be released on October 14 of the same year. Carpenter also announced that she would be embarking on her first headlining concert tour titled the "Evolution Tour" set for the autumn of 2016. Three promotional singles were released from the album titled "All We Have Is Love", "Run and Hide", and "Thumbs" with the latter going on to be the albums second official single. In October 2016 "Evolution" debuted and peaked on the Billboard 200 at number 28 selling 13,000 copies within its first week. "Thumbs" would impact contemporary hit radio as the albums second single on January 3, 2017, with its music video being released in February of the same year. Carpenter later performed "Thumbs" on the Late Late Show with James Corden on April 17, 2017.

She collaborated with The Vamps and Mike Perry for the single "Hands", which was released in May 2017. In the summer of 2017 Carpenter embarked on her second headlining concert tour titled "The De-Tour". Carpenter released the single "Why" in July 2017 which would go on to peak at number 21 on the Billboard Bubbling Under Hot 100 becoming her second entry on the chart. In October 2017, Lost Kings released a single called "First Love" in which Carpenter is featured on. Carpenter collaborated with Lindsey Stirling on her holiday album "Warmer in the Winter" on the song "You're a Mean One, Mr. Grinch" which was released in October of 2017. In December 2017, Carpenter released a cover of "Have Yourself a Merry Little Christmas".

In March 2018, Carpenter released a single "Alien" with Jonas Blue. They performed the song on Jimmy Kimmel Live! that month.

 2018–2020: Singular and other ventures 
In early May 2018 Carpenter deleted all of her posts on her Instagram account prompting fans to speculate if new music was on the way. On May 13, 2018, Carpenter announced via Twitter that her new single "Almost Love" would be released on June 6 of that same year while also announcing a performance at the 2018 iHeartRadio Wango Tango Music Festival . In October 2018, Carpenter would go on to announce her 3rd studio album would be titled "Singular: Act I" and would be released on November 9, 2018. She would also release a trailer for the album via Twitter with various clips of the songs that would be featured on the album. Two promotional singles were released ahead of the album titled "Paris" and "Bad Time", the former of which was released on October 24 and would go on to have its own music video. The album's second official single, "Sue Me", was released the same day as the album on November 9, 2018. Carpenter would also go on to perform "Sue Me" on the The Today Show  as well as Live with Kelly and Ryan in November 2018.

In early 2019 Carpenter would be featured on Alan Walker's single "On My Way". In March 2019, Carpenter embarked on her 3rd headlining concert tour titled The Singular Tour in which she performed two new songs titled "Pushing 20", and "Exhale". That same month, "Pushing 20" was released as Singular: Act II's lead single while "Exhale" would go on to be released in May 2019 as the albums second single. On June 6, 2019, Carpenter unveiled the albums cover art as well as announced that the albums third single would be titled "In My Bed" with its music video being released on June 28, 2019. On July 5th, 2019 Carpenter performed on Good Morning Americas Summer Concert Series, where she debuted the performances of "On My Way" and "In My Bed". She also performed her songs "Sue Me", "Why", "Paris". On July 11, 2019, Carpenter released a promotional single titled "I'm Fakin" ahead of the albums release. Singular: Act II was released on July 19, 2019. In July 2019, Carpenter began work on a fifth studio album.

In February 2020, Carpenter released a single titled "Honeymoon Fades" followed by her Broadway debut in Mean Girls in March 2020. After just two showings "Mean Girls" and many other Broadway productions shut down due to the COVID-19 Pandemic. On January 7, 2021, it was announced that Mean Girls would not reopen, ending her Broadway run. In April 2020, Carpenter appeared in a charity version of "If the World Was Ending", which supported Doctors Without Borders during the COVID-19 pandemic. In July 2020, Carpenter released another single, "Let Me Move You", from the Netflix film "Work It" in which she also starred and executive produced. In September 2020, she featured on a remix of Zara Larsson's song titled "Wow". In December 2020, she was named to Forbes' 30 Under 30 list in the Hollywood and entertainment category. In January 2021, Carpenter announced that she had become an artist with Universal Music Group's Island Records.

 2021–present: Emails I Can't Send 
In January 2021, Carpenter announced that she had become an artist with Universal Music Group's Island Records. Her first debut single under the new record label would a single titled "Skin", being released on January 22, 2021. The song would go on to debut at number 48 on the Billboard Hot 100 becoming her first entry on the chart. Carpenter would go on to perform the song on "The "Late Late Show with James Cordon" and at the "32nd annual GLAAD Media awards" ceremony. The music video for "Skin" was released on February 1, 2021 with Carpenter being credited as the videos creative director.

On September 9, 2021 Carpenter announced that the lead single from her upcoming 5th studio album would be titled "Skinny Dipping" with the song having co-writing credits from Julia Michaels and JP Saxe. The music video for 'Skinny Dipping" would premiere on the same day of the songs release. She would promote the song with a performance on The Tonight Show Starring Jimmy Fallon on October 29, 2021.

In January 2022, Carpenter would make another appearance on "The Tonight Show Starring Jimmy Fallon" to announce the albums second single would be titled "Fast Times". While on the show Sabrina spoke to Fallon saying “I’ve hidden the album name somewhere in work that I’ve put out over the last year...but my fans haven't found it yet”. "Fast Times" would be released on February 18, 2022 with it's music video premiering on the same day. Carpenter opened up to Rolling Stone about the meaning of the song saying “[It’s] really about the feeling when you’re letting life steer the wheel and you think ‘Let me enjoy this now and I’ll process the emotional repercussions of this later,'”. In March of 2022, Carpenter would perform "Skinny Dipping" and "Fast Times" at the "Galaxy Creator Collective" event hosted by Samsung.

On July 1, 2022, Carpenter reveled that her 5th Studio album would be titled "Emails I Can't Send" and would be released just two weeks later on July 15, 2022. The albums third single "Vicious" was also released on July 1, 2022. "Emails I Can't Send" would go on to debut and peak at number 23 on the US Billboard 200, with 18,000 album equivalent units making it her highest entry on the chart to date. The albums fourth single "Because I Liked a Boy" was released alongside the album on July 15, 2022 with it's music video premiering on the same day. Following the album's release, she conducted a livestream concert at Samsung and Billboard's "Summer of Galaxy" annual event. In August 2022, Carpenter would perform the albums fourth single "Because I Liked a Boy" on The Late Late Show with James Cordon.

In November 2022, Carpenter announced that her song "Nonsense" would be the albums fifth single with it's music video being released on November 10 2022. A Holiday themed version of the song would go on to be released in December 2022 titled "A Nonsense Christmas". Carpenter would further promote the song with a performance on the late night show Jimmy Kimmel Live! In January 2023, "Nonsense" would debut on the Billboard Hot 100 at number 75 and spend a total of seven weeks on the chart making it her longest entry on the chart.

In August 2022, Carpenter announced the Emails I Can't Send Tour, in support of her album, the first leg of the tour began in the fall of 2022. In December 2022, a second leg for North America was announced set for the spring of 2023. In January 2022, Carpenter announced a European leg of the tour set for the month of June 2023.

 Discography 

 Eyes Wide Open (2015)
 Evolution (2016)
 Singular: Act I (2018)
 Singular: Act II (2019)
 Emails I Can't Send'' (2022)

Concert tours

Headlining 
 Evolution Tour (2016–2017)
 The De-Tour (2017)
 Singular Tour (2019)
 Emails I Can't Send Tour (2022–2023)

Festivals (with various artists) 
 Jingle Ball Tour 2016 (2016)
 Jingle Ball Tour 2017 (2017)
 Jingle Ball Tour 2018 (2018)

Opening act 
 Bridgit Mendler – Summer Tour (2014)
 Ariana Grande – Dangerous Woman Tour (2017)
 The Vamps – UK Arena Tour (2017)

Filmography

Stage

Awards and nominations

References

External links 

 
 

1999 births
21st-century American actresses
21st-century American singers
21st-century American women singers
People from Quakertown, Pennsylvania
American child actresses
American child singers
American film actresses
American television actresses
American voice actresses
Hollywood Records artists
Island Records artists
Living people
Music YouTubers
Singers from Pennsylvania
American contemporary R&B singers
Electropop musicians
Dance-pop musicians
American women pop singers